Homosaces arvalis is a moth in the family Cosmopterigidae. It is found in India.

The wingspan is 15–17 mm. The forewings are ferruginous sprinkled with black. The costa and all veins are marked with suffused pale ochreous-yellow streaks. The hindwings are dark grey.

References

Natural History Museum Lepidoptera generic names catalog

Moths described in 1910
Cosmopterigidae